Stock Beck is a minor river in the West Craven area of Pendle, Lancashire (formerly in Yorkshire).

Course
Rising as Calf Hall Beck near Higher Laithe Farm on Weets Hill it flows north east into Barnoldswick, where it meets Gillians Beck and turns north becoming known as Butts Beck. Stock Beck leaves the town before heading northwest to meet Fools Syke and then Hell Forest Dike near Gilbeber Hill. After passing under the Monks Bridge on the A59 road at Horton it collects Horton Beck and heads west. It meets Flush Beck and then Bottom Beck near the hamlet of Bracewell. After the confluence with Spittle Syke, it passes under the Stock Beck viaduct on the Ribble Valley line and the A682 Long Preston road, north of the village Gisburn and joins the River Ribble at Gisburne Park.

Tributaries

Spittle Syke
Horton Beck
Bottom Beck
Lodge Hill Syke
Old Park Syke
Wedacre Syke
Hesketh Rough Syke
Flush Beck
Hell Forest Dike
Turpit Gate Syke
Hayfield Dike
Tosber Syke
Fools Syke
Ray Gill Water
Ray Gill
Horrox Gill
Crownest Syke
Gillians Beck
Moor Side Beck

References

Rivers of Lancashire
Rivers of the Borough of Pendle
Rivers of Ribble Valley
Barnoldswick
1Stock